The 2013–14 EHF Cup was the 33rd edition of the EHF Cup and the second edition since the merger of the EHF Cup with the EHF Cup Winners' Cup. In the present format, the tournament began in early September with three knockout qualifying rounds, which concluded by late November. The 16 surviving teams were then allocated into four groups of four, where teams played against each other home-and-away in a round-robin format. The four group winners and four runners-up qualified to the quarter-finals, with each of the quarter-final winners proceeding to the Final 4 tournament played in May 2014. However, because the hosts of the Final 4 tournament, Füchse Berlin, finished the group stage among the group winners, they have clinched the direct ticket to the final weekend and decided that only three quarter-finals were played for the remaining spots in the final tournament as only the top three second-placed teams qualified to the quarter-finals. The final tournament was won by Hungarian side Pick Szeged.

Bids for the Final 4 venue
There were a total of seven bids submitted to the EHF for hosting the 2013–14 EHF Cup final four tournament that will take place in May 2014. The list of bidders consists of five clubs participating in the 2013–14 EHF Cup and two external stakeholders. In order to host the final four tournament a venue must fulfill a set of criteria that reflects the nature of a high-profile international club event such as the EHF Cup Finals. The decision who will host the tournament was decided by the EHF and its marketing arm EHF Marketing GmbH.

On 5 December 2013 in Vienna, Austria the EHF President Jean Brihault signed an official contract with Füchse Berlin's manager Bob Henning for organization of the final four tournament, which will take place between 17–18 May 2014. The four games of the finals will be organized in the Max-Schmeling-Halle in the German capital Berlin. The German organizers expect at least 10,000 people for each day of the final weekend.

Overview

Team allocation
The labels in the parentheses show how each team qualified for the place of its starting round:
2nd, 3rd, 4th, 5th, 6th, etc.: League position
ECL: Transferred from the EHF Champions League
QS: Losers from the qualification tournaments
WC: Losers from the wildcard matches

Qualification stage

Round 1
Teams listed first played the first leg at home. Some teams agreed to play both matches in the same venue. Highlighted teams qualified into the second round.

Notes

Round 2
Teams listed first played the first leg at home. Some teams agreed to play both matches in the same venue. Highlighted teams qualified into the third round.

Notes

Round 3
Before the draw, which took place on 22 October 2013 at the EHF headquarters in Vienna, 32 teams from 20 countries were divided into two pots without the country protection rule, meaning that two teams from the same country could face each other. The first legs were played on 23–24 November and the second legs one week later.

Teams listed first played the first leg at home. Highlighted teams qualified into the group stage.

Group stage

Draw and format
The draw of the EHF Cup group phase was carried out on 5 December 2013 in Vienna, Austria. The teams were positioned into four pots, with the country protection rule applied: two clubs from the same country may not face each other in the same group.

The group stage features 16 teams, which were allocated four groups of four. In each group, teams play against each other home-and-away in a round-robin format. The matchdays are 8–9 February, 15–16 February, 22–23 February, 15–16 March, 22–23 March, and 29–30 March 2014. The top two teams from each group qualified for the quarter-finals, which were scheduled in April 2013.

If Füchse Berlin, as the organiser of the Final 4 tournament, win their group or finish among top three second-ranked teams, they will receive a direct qualification to the Final 4 tournament. If the German side wins their group then the other three group winners and the three best second ranked team will qualify for the quarter-finals. If the Germans finish among the top three second-ranked teams, the quarter-finals will consist of four group winners and two best second-ranked teams. If Füchse Berlin finish as the worst second-ranked team, they will have to play the quarter-final match. Should the German club rank on the third or fourth position in their group, they will be out of the competition, but they will still organize the Final 4 tournament.

If two or more teams are equal on points on completion of the group matches, the following criteria are applied to determine the rankings (in descending order):
number of points in matches of all teams directly involved;
goal difference in matches of all teams directly involved;
greater number of plus goals in matches of all teams directly involved;
goal difference in all matches of the group;
greater number of plus goals in all matches of the group;

If no ranking can be determined, a decision shall be obtained by drawing lots. Lots shall be drawn by the EHF, if possible in the presence of a responsible of each club.

Group A

Group B

Group C

Group D

Ranking of the second-placed teams
The ranking of the second-placed teams is carried out on the basis of  the team's results in the group stage. Because the German side Füchse Berlin, the organizers of the Final 4 tournament, finished on top of their group they qualified directly to the final tournament and only the top three second-placed teams qualified to the quarter-finals.

Knockout stage

Quarter-finals

Draw and format
Because the hosts of the Final 4 tournament, Füchse Berlin, finished the group stage among the group winners, they have clinched the direct ticket to the final weekend and decided that only three quarter-finals will be played for the remaining spots in the final tournament. The draw of the EHF Cup quarter-finals was carried out on Tuesday 1 April 2014 at the EHF headquarters in Vienna, Austria. Six teams were positioned into two pots with the country protection rule not applied: two clubs from the same country could face each other in the quarter-finals. However, teams from the same group cannot face each other in the quarter-finals. The first pot contained the three group winners and the second pot contained the top three second-placed teams.

In the quarter-finals, teams played against each other on a home-and-away basis, with the teams from second pot playing the first leg at home. The first leg matches were played over 19–21 April, and the second leg matches were played over 26–27 April.

Final four
The tournament was played at the 8,700 capacity Max-Schmeling-Halle in the German capital Berlin, the home of Füchse Berlin.

Top goalscorers

See also
2013–14 EHF Champions League
2013–14 EHF Challenge Cup

References
General

Specific

Cup
Cup
EHF Cup seasons